Katharine Emma Doré, OBE, (born February 1960) is a British theatrical producer who established the Adventures in Motion Pictures troupe. She is a vice-president and co-founder of Ambitious about Autism. In 2009, Doré was awarded the Order of the British Empire for her work in special education.

References

Living people
Officers of the Order of the British Empire
1960 births
Alumni of the Royal Central School of Speech and Drama
Trustees of educational establishments